This is a list of German television-related events in 2015.

Events

5 March – After winning Unser Song für Österreich with the song "Heart of Stone" and the chance to represent Germany at the Eurovision Song Contest 2015, Andreas Kümmert dramatically declined the opportunity and gives the prize to the runner-up, Ann Sophie instead. She will now perform her song "Black Smoke" at the contest in May.
24 April - 13-year-old Noah-Levi Korth wins the third season of The Voice Kids.
5 June - Footballer Hans Sarpei and his partner Kathrin Menzinger win the eighth season of Let's Dance.
28 August - Former footballer David Odonkor wins season 3 of Promi Big Brother.
12 December - 29-year-old singer Jay Oh wins the ninth season of Das Supertalent.
17 December - Jamie-Lee Kriewitz wins the fifth season of The Voice of Germany.
22 December - Lusy Skaya wins the twelfth season of Big Brother.

Debuts
27 February - Die Himmelsleiter – Sehnsucht nach Morgen (2015) (ARD)
22 September - Big Brother Germany (2000-2011, 2015–present)

Television shows

1950s
Tagesschau (1952–present)

1960s
 heute (1963–present)

1970s
 heute-journal (1978–present)
 Tagesthemen (1978–present)

1980s
Lindenstraße (1985–present)

1990s
Gute Zeiten, schlechte Zeiten (1992–present)
Unter uns (1994–present)
Verbotene Liebe (1995-2015)
Schloss Einstein (1998–present)
In aller Freundschaft (1998–present)
Wer wird Millionär? (1999–present)

2000s
Deutschland sucht den Superstar (2002–present)
Let's Dance (2006–present)
Das Supertalent (2007–present)

2010s
The Voice of Germany (2011–present)
Promi Big Brother (2013–present)

Ending this year
Verbotene Liebe (1995-2015)

Births

Deaths

See also 
2015 in Germany

References